James Church Alvord (April 14, 1808 – September 27, 1839) was a U.S. Representative from Massachusetts.

Born in Greenwich, Massachusetts, Alvord completed preparatory studies and was graduated from Dartmouth College, Hanover, New Hampshire, in 1827. He studied law and was admitted to the bar in 1830, commencing the practice of his profession in Greenfield, Massachusetts. He served as member of the State house of representatives in 1837.
He served in the State senate in 1838.

Alvord was elected as a Whig to the Twenty-sixth Congress and served from March 4, 1839, until his death in Greenfield, Massachusetts, on September 27, 1839, before the Congress assembled. He was interred in Federal Street Cemetery.

See also
List of United States Congress members who died in office (1790–1899)

References

BIOGRAPHICAL SKETCH OF JAMES C. ALVORD The American jurist and law magazine page 373, 1843.

1808 births
1839 deaths
Dartmouth College alumni
Massachusetts state senators
Members of the Massachusetts House of Representatives
Whig Party members of the United States House of Representatives from Massachusetts
19th-century American politicians
People from Greenwich, Massachusetts